Gary R. Wade is a former Chief Justice of the Tennessee Supreme Court. Following retirement he was named Vice President and Dean of Lincoln Memorial University's Duncan School of Law on July 28, 2015, taking the position on September 9, 2015.

Education
Wade received his Bachelor of Science degree cum laude from the University of Tennessee in 1970 and his Juris Doctor from the University of Tennessee College of Law in 1973.

Career
Wade was in private practice from 1973 to 1987. He served as the mayor of Sevierville from 1977 to 1987. Wade was appointed to the Tennessee Court of Criminal Appeals in 1987, and was elected 1988. He was re-elected in 1990, 1998 and 2006. Wade served as presiding judge of the court from 1998 to 2006.

Wade was appointed to the Tennessee supreme court on May 30, 2006 by Governor Phil Bredesen and took office on September 1, 2006. He was one of four justices on the five-justice court appointed by Bredesen. Wade served as chief justice on September 1, 2012 from to August 31, 2014.

Wade was retained by Tennessee's voters to a full eight-year term on the court in August 2008 and retained again in August 2014 to another eight-year term.  Wade retired on September 8, 2015.

The state's Judicial Performance Evaluation Commission recommended Justice Wade be retained for another term in the August 7, 2014 retention election.

Awards and recognition
2011: Scouts of America Great Smoky Mountain Council Good Scout Award
2010: Recipient of the Legacy Award from Friends of the Smokies
2009: Lincoln Memorial University Commencement, Keynote Speaker
2007–2008: Power100, Business TN
2007: Raymond L. Gardner Alumnus of the Year, Phi Delta Theta Fraternity
2007: United States Department of Interior Citizens Award for Exceptional Service
2006: East Tennessee Regional Leadership Award
2006: University of Tennessee College of Law Commencement, Keynote Speaker
2005, 2008: American Legion Boys State, Keynote Speaker
2005: Garden Club of America Conservation Award
2004: Appellate Judge of the Year, American Board of Trial Advocates
2004: Judicial Excellence Award, Knoxville Bar Association
2004: Citizen of the Year, Sevierville Chamber of Commerce
2004: Sevier County High School Wall of Fame
2001: Thornton Athletic Student Life Center Award, University of Tennessee
2000: Walters State Community College Commencement, Keynote Speaker
1999: Lions Club International Melvin Jones Fellow
1997–Present: United Way Leadership Society
1996: Pellissippi State Technical Community College Commencement, Keynote Speaker
1996: Superintendent's MVP – Great Smoky Mountains National Park
1987: Sevierville Chamber of Commerce Award
1987: Gary R. Wade Boulevard
1987: Key to City Award by City of Sevierville
1987: American Heart Association Presidential Award
1983, 84, 85, 97: Sevier County Mover and Shaker of the Year by The Mountain Press
1980: Outstanding Young Men of America, Who's Who in American Law

Associations
 Member, American Bar Association
1995-1996: Delegate
 Member, Tennessee Bar Association
1980-1988: House of Delegates
1995-1996: Board of Governors
2008-Present: Fellow, Young Lawyers Division 
 Member, Knoxville Bar Association
2004  Board of Governors
 Member, Sevier County Bar Association
1988–Present:  Member, American Inns of Court
 2009–Present: Fellow, American Bar Foundation
 2008–Present: Fellow, Knoxville Bar Foundation
 2006–Present: Phi Delta Theta Educational Foundation
 1998–Present: Tennessee Bar Association Fellow, Young Lawyers Division
 Walters State Community College Foundation
 2005–2006: President
 1998–Present: Board of Trustees
 1996–Present: Founder and secretary, Tennessee Judicial Conference Foundation
 1996–Present: Member, Tennessee Supreme Court Historical Society
 1994–Present: Fellow, Tennessee Bar Foundation
 1994–Present: Dean's Circle, University of Tennessee
 1993–Present: Board of Visitors, University of Tennessee
 1993–Present: Friends of the Great Smoky Mountains National Park, co-founder, past president, and president emeritus
 1987–Present: Tennessee Judicial Conference; President, 1995–1996
 1998–2006: Member, Council of Chief Judges
 2004–2005: Member, Governor's Task Force on Sentencing
 2003–2005: Maryville College Board of Trustees; Finance Committee, 2004–2005
 1998–2005: UT Development Council
 1997–2002: Pellissippi State Technical Community College, President's Associates
 1990–1997: Eta South Province President, Phi Delta Theta Fraternity
 1996: Member, Special Joint Committee (Senate Joint Resolution 477) on Special and Pro Tempore Judges
 1995–1996: Tennessee Bar Association Board of Governors
 1995–1996: Leadership Knoxville Class
 1993–1996: Member, Commission on Future of the Tennessee Judicial System
 1990–1994: Member, Tennessee Sentencing Commission
 1980–1988: Tennessee Bar Association House of Delegates
 1985–1987: Member, Tennessee Municipal Bond Fund, Board of Directors and Treasurer
 1983–1987: Member, Tennessee Municipal Attorneys Association
 1983–1987: Member, National Association of Municipal Law Officers
 1973–1987: Member, Tennessee Trial Lawyers Association
 1973–1984: Member, Tennessee Association of Criminal Defense Lawyers; Board of Directors, 1978–1984

Community Involvement
 1972: Sevierville Lions Club, Past President
 1972–1987: Sevier County Volunteer Legal Assistance Program
 1977–1979: Sevierville Community Center Capital Campaign, Chair
 1984, 1985, 1986: Sevier County Heart Association, Chairman
 1984–1986, 2004–2006: Sevier County United Way, Board of Directors
 1986–1987: East Tennessee Chapter of American Heart Association, Vice President
 1989–1994: First United Methodist Church of Sevierville, Finance Chair
 1996–2000: First United Methodist Church Conference, Finance Chair, Maryville District
Friends of the Great Smoky Mountains National Park 
 1993–2005: Co-Founder and President
 2005–2006: Board Chair
 2007–Present: Chairman Emeritus
 1996–2002: East Tennessee Foundation Board of Directors 
 1996: Honorary Chair, Boys & Girls Club of the Smoky Mountains Capital Campaign
 1997–1998: Board of Directors, YMCA Metropolitan Knoxville
 1997–2004: Board of Directors, AAA East Tennessee
 1997: Board of Directors, United Way of Greater Knoxville Campaign Cabinet 
 1997–2008: Board of Directors, Tennessee's Resource Valley
 1998–2000, 2006–Present: East Tennessee Historical Society Board of Directors
 1998–Present: Sevier County High School Foundation Board of Directors
Knoxville Zoological Gardens
 2000–2006: Board of Directors
 2002–2004: Vice Chair
 2005–2006: Chair
 2006–Present: Honorary Director
 2000–2003: Board of Directors, Fort Sanders Foundation 
 2000–2002: Nine Counties, One Vision, Chair, Transportation Committee
 2001–2006: ALCOA Community Advisory Board
 2002–2004: Knoxville Symphony Orchestra Board 
 2003–2005: Board of Directors, Friends of Headrick Chapel
 2004–Present: Sevier County Library Foundation
 2004–2006: Board of Directors, Museum of Appalachia, Vice Chair
 Leadership Sevier
 1996: Co-Founder
 1996–present: Board of Directors
 2001: President

References

Living people
Mayors of places in Tennessee
People from Sevierville, Tennessee
Justices of the Tennessee Supreme Court
University of Tennessee alumni
University of Tennessee College of Law alumni
Year of birth missing (living people)
Place of birth missing (living people)